Kilimanoor Palace is a palace located in Kilimanoor, in the Indian state of Kerala. It is the birthplace of painter Raja Ravi Varma and Raghava Varma, the father of king Marthanda Varma.

The Palace
The Palace complex covers more than six hectares, and comprises the traditional residential structures of Kerala, like the Nalukettu, small and medium-sized buildings, three ponds, wells and sacred groves (kaavu). 
Raja Ravi Varma is said to have built and maintained some of the buildings from the proceeds of his paintings.
Families related to the Travancore royal house continue to live here.

History
The royal house at Choottayil, Kilimanoor has a history stretching back more than 300 years, although the oldest buildings are from a much earlier period. However, it was in 1753 that the palace was built in its present form.

Kilimanoor palace and Travancore royal house

The estate of Kilimanoor originally belonged to a Pillai ruling chief and was forfeited to Travancore by Maharaja Marthanda Varma. The estate comprising several villages was then handed over to the family of the father of the King who had come south from Parappanad in Malabar around 1718. 

In 1705 (ME 880) the son and two daughters of Ittammar Raja of Beypore Thattarikovilakam, a Parappanad royal house, were adopted into the Royal house of Venad. Ittammar Raja's sister and her sons, Rama Varma and Raghava Varma, settled in Kilimanoor and married the now adopted sisters. Marthanda Varma, the founder of the Kingdom of Travancore, was the son of Raghava Varma. The nephew of Raghava Varma, Ravi Varma Koil Thampuran, married the sister of Marthanda Varma. Their son became known as Dharma Raja Kartika Thirunnal Rama Varma.

In 1740 when an allied force, led by Dutchman Captain Hockert supporting the Deshinganadu King, attacked Venad, an army from Kilimanoor resisted and then defeated them. Although a small victory, this was the first time an Indian army had defeated a European power. In 1753, in recognition of this feat, Marthanda Varma exempted the areas controlled by the Kilimanoor palace from taxes, and granted them autonomous status. The present palace complex was built at this time, together with the Ayyappa temple. for the family deity, Sastha or Ayyapan.

Velu Thampi Dalawa held meetings at Kilimanoor palace while planning uprisings against the British. He handed over his sword at the palace before going into his final battle against the British, and India's first President, Dr Rajendra Prasad received this sword from the palace and it was kept in the National Museum in Delhi. Afterwards the sword was moved to the Napier Museum, Trivandrum.

Personalities
Raja Ravi Varma, painter
Kareendran thampuran, poet, composer, childhood friend Of Swathi Thirunal
Raja Raja Varma, uncle of Raja Ravi Varma.
C. Raja Raja Varma Koil Thampuran, painter, brother of Raja Ravi Varma                  
Shri. Madhavan Vaidyan   [Kilimanoor Royal Physician]

See also
 Marthandavarma (novel)

References

Website on Swathi Thirunal
Kerala tourism
Column in The Sunday Express by Shreekumar Varma
 Sivasankaran Nair K, VeNAadinTe pariNamam (വെണാടിന്റെ പരിണാമം), in Malayalam,Current Books, 2005.
 From the Tourist brochure by  Kilimanoor Kottara Charithra Sangraham, Kilimanoor Palace.                  
                        *S.A.V.SMARAKA VAIDHYA SALA,TAZHAVA,KOLLAM[DIST]

Footnotes

Kingdom of Travancore
Palaces in Thiruvananthapuram
Royal residences in India